This is a list of North Atlantic Treaty Organization (NATO) exercises.

Cold War (1950–1990)

 Mainbrace - Defence of Denmark and Norway during September 1952.
 200 ships
 over 50,000 personnel 
 Exercise Grand Slam. Naval exercise in the Mediterranean Sea in 1952.
 Exercise Longstep. Large naval exercise in the Mediterranean Sea in 1952.
 Exercise Italic Weld, a combined air-naval-ground exercise in northern Italy during August 1953
 Exercise Grand Repulse during September 1953
 British Army on the Rhine (BAOR)
 Netherlands Corps 
 Allied Air Forces Central Europe (AAFCE)
 Exercise Monte Carlo, a simulated atomic air-ground exercise during September 1953
 Central Army Group
 Exercise Weldfast, a combined amphibious landing exercise in the Mediterranean Sea during October 1953
 American, British, Greek, Italian and Turkish naval forces.
During Exercise Battle Royal in September 1954, I Corps (Belgium) consisted of 1 (BE) Infantry Division and 16 (BE) Armoured Division with 1 Canadian Brigade and 46 Parachute Brigade (16th Airborne Division (United Kingdom)) under command.
 Operation Counter Punch. 1957
 Operation Strikeback. 1957. Involved 200 warships, 650 aircraft, and 75,000 personnel from the United States Navy, the Royal Navy, the Royal Canadian Navy, the French Navy, the Royal Netherlands Navy, and the Royal Norwegian Navy. Was the largest peacetime naval operation up to that time, according to the New York Times.
 Operation Deep Water. 1957
 Exercise Reforger was a major annual exercise and campaign conducted from 1969 to 1993, mainly on German territory.
 Northern Wedding was a naval exercise held 1970-1986, designed to test NATO's ability to rearm and resupply Europe.
 Exercise Able Archer was an annual exercise by NATO military forces in Europe. Able Archer 83, carried out in November 1983, is believed to have nearly started a nuclear war with the Soviet Union.

Post-Cold War (1990–present)
 Northern Viking. Annual exercise held in Iceland, every two years until 2006 when the frequency was increased. Tests capability and inter-operability of forces. Includes naval vessels, fighter planes and helicopters from multiple countries. Size example: involved transfer of 400 foreign troops to iceland in 2008.
 Joint Warrior. Ongoing since sometime in the Cold War. Up to 13,000 personnel. Airborne assaults, amphibious landings, counter-insurgency, counter-piracy and interstate war. Held in UK. Currently done twice a year (as of 2022).
 Frisian Flag. Major aerial exercise in Netherlands. Annual, first held 1992. Uses about 70 aircraft. Eg about 1000 personnel in 2018.
 Unified Vision. Twice-yearly exercise which began in 2012 to test advanced defense systems at the Ørland Main Air Station in Norway.
 BALTOPS Annual US-led maritime exercise in Germany and the Baltic Sea. Participating countries include Denmark, Estonia, France, Germany, Latvia, Lithuania, the Netherlands, Poland, Finland and Sweden.

1997
 Baltic Challenge. Naval.

1998
 Baltic Challenge. Naval.

1999
 Battle Griffin. 20,000 soldiers. 16 February to 3 March in Norway. Land, sea, air and Home Guard Forces from 8 NATO countries (Canada, Denmark, France, Germany, Netherlands, Norway, the United Kingdom and the United States) participated.

2006
 Cold Response: Took place in Norway in March, involving 10,000 troops from 11 countries under Norwegian leadership.

2009
 Cold Response. Norwegian-led, in Norway 16–25 March.
 Cooperative 09. 1100 troops; held in Georgia.
 Loyal Arrow 09. Largest military exercise ever held in Sweden, involving 900 ground troops, 50 aircraft, and a British aircraft carrier with 1000 sailors onboard.

2010
 Cold Response. 9,000 troops from 14 countries. Norwegian-led in Norway 17 Feb - 4 March.

2012
 Cold Response. 16,000 troops. Norwegian-led in Norway in March.

2014
 Cold Response. More than 16,000 troops. Norwegian-led in Norway in March.
 Atlantic Resolve. Four companies of U.S. forces (about 150 troops each) rotate continuously throughout the year, deployed in Estonia, Lithuania, Latvia and Poland. Also  U.S. Air Force Joint Terminal Attack Controller from the 2nd Air Support Operations Squadron out of Vilseck, Germany.

2015
 Atlantic Resolve. Several U.S. fighter squadrons and U.K. Royal Air Force "Task Force Brawler" operate in Poland, Lithuania, Estonia and Latvia.
 Dragoon Ride. Small operation connected with Atlantic Resolve.
 Spring Storm (Siil, Hedgehog). 13,000 troops including 7,000 reservists. Article 5-type scenario in Estonia in May.

2016
 Cold Response 16. More than 15,000 troops. Norwegian-led in Trøndelag, Norway from 29 February - 11 March.
 Air Component
 United States
 Boeing B-52H Stratofortresses of the 2nd Bomb Wing
 Boeing KC-135 Stratotankers
 General Dynamics F-16 Fighting Falcons
 Lockheed C-130 Herculeses
 Anaconda 2016. Polish-led exercises involving 31,000 military personnel from 24 NATO and non-NATO countries, including 14,000 from the U.S., 12,000 from Poland and 800 from the UK. Elements of the NATO Response Force participated in the exercises. Took place from 7 June to 17 June.
 Atlantic Resolve. Several U.S. fighter squadrons and U.K aviation Task Force operate in Poland, Lithuania, Estonia and Latvia.

2017
 Atlantic Resolve. Several U.S. fighter squadrons, U.S. 10th Combat Aviation Brigade, a U.S. Army Aviation Brigade of 400 soldiers and, also from the U.S., 3500 army troops, 87 tanks and 144 Bradley Fighting Vehicles operated in Bulgaria, Poland, Lithuania, Estonia and Latvia.
 Rapid Trident. 2500 personnel, including Canadian. Location: Ukraine.

2018
 Exercise Trident Juncture 2018. 50,000 troops. Held in Trøndelag, Oppland and Hedmark, Norway mainly in October–November. Stated purpose was to train the NATO Response Force.
 Atlantic Resolve. Several U.S. fighter squadrons, a U.S. Army Aviation Brigade and a U.S. Army Brigade Combat Team operated in Eastern Europe.

2019
 Atlantic Resolve. Several U.S. fighter squadrons, a U.S. Army Aviation Brigade and a U.S. Army Brigade Combat Team operated in Eastern Europe.
 Iron Spear (7 October—13 October). Hosted in Latvia, 28 tank crews from eight countries take part in maneuvering, targeting and shooting exercises.

2020
In 2020, NATO conducted 88 of 113 planned NATO exercises, the reduction in number being due to the COVID-19 pandemic. NATO countries also held 176 other national and multinational exercises. The exerises included the following:
 DEFENDER-Europe 20. U.S.-led multinational exercise including NATO participation. Included 20,000 soldiers deployed directly from the U.S. to Europe.
 Dynamic Mongoose 20. NATO-led. 29 June to 10 July 2020 in the High North. Ships, submarines, aircraft and personnel from six Allied nations (France, Germany, Norway, UK, Canada and U.S.) exercised off the coast of Iceland for anti-submarine warfare and anti-surface warfare training.
 Cold Response. Suspended due to the pandemic.
 Bomber Task Force. Strategic bomber mission held since 2018 for U.S. integration with NATO allies. 
 Atlantic Resolve. Several U.S. fighter squadrons, a U.S. Army Aviation Brigade and a U.S. Army Brigade Combat Team operated in Eastern Europe.
 Iron Spear (10 October—15 October). Hosted in Latvia, 44 armored fighting vehicles representing twelve countries take part in an armored gunnery competition.

Six U.S. Air Force B-52 Stratofortress bomber aircraft from the 5th Bomb Wing, Minot Air Force Base, North Dakota, arrived at RAF Fairford, England on 22 August 2020 for a planned training mission where the aircraft conducted theater and flight training across Europe and Africa.

On 4 September, the American B-52s entered the airspace of Ukraine for the first time in history, where they made a long flight along the borders of the Crimean peninsula.

On 25 September, two U.S. bombers staged a mock attack run on Kaliningrad, a Russian semi-exclave on the Baltic between Poland and Lithuania, where Russia moved nuclear-capable missiles in 2018. The flight path allowed the bombers effectively to fly a circle around Kaliningrad. The simulated raid on the region was a test case of neutralizing Russian missile systems.

Altogether, in August–September 2020, two U.S. Air Force B-52 Stratofortress bomber aircraft, integrated with Norwegian F-35 and F-16 fighter aircraft as well as Norwegian frigates, flew over international waters in the vicinity of the Norwegian Sea.

2021
In 2021, NATO expected to conduct 95 NATO exercises and NATO countries were expected to conduct 220 other national and multinational exercises. 
The NATO exercises were to include 24 land-focused exercises, 24 air exercises, 9 maritime exercises and 20 multi-domain exercises. Other exercises were to be conducted to train specific functions such as cyber defence, crisis response decision-making, Chemical,  Biological,  Radiological  Nuclear  defense,  logistics,  communications  and  medical activities. The exercises included the following:

 Griffin Force I 2021. Training of land component of NATO Very High Readiness Joint Task Force in enablement and rapid military mobility, 18–20 January in Poland, Lithuania, Estonia and Latvia.
 Defender-Europe 21. 30,000 troops. Mid-March through June. Included "nearly simultaneous operations across more than 30 training areas" in Albania, Estonia, Bulgaria, Romania, Kosovo  and other countries. 
 Locked Shields 21. "One of the world's largest and most complex live cyber defence exercises, hosted annually by the NATO Cooperative Cyber Defence Centre of Excellence...  The exercise simulates responding to a massive cyber incident, and includes strategic decision-making, legal and communication aspects. Held 1–30 April in Estonia.
 CAPABLE DEPLOYER 2021 – NATO Allied Force Interoperability Exercise. Romania, 2 May to 23 May. Planned and coordinated by the Multinational Logistics Center.
 Wind Spring 21. Romania, 2 May to 27 May. Joint and multinational NATO military operations.
 Ramstein Ambition 21 – The NATO Electronic Warfare Force Integration Programme with regional elements of NATO's Integrated Air and Missile Defence System conducted through the Combined Air Operation Centre (CAOC), which took place between 3 May and 14 May.
 Spring Storm. 14,000 troops, 11 May to 31 May in Estonia. "A large live exercise of the Estonian Defence Forces with participation from NATO's Enhanced Forward Presence battlegroups and other Allied forces."
 Breeze 21. Live exercise led by Bulgarian Navy from 11–19 July. Size: around 2500 people.
 Iron Wolf II 21. 4000 troops. Live exercise, 1–26 November in Lithuania to train NATO's Enhanced Forward Presence.
 Atlantic Resolve. Several U.S. fighter squadrons, a U.S. Army Aviation Brigade and a U.S. Army Brigade Combat Team operated in Eastern Europe.
 Cold Response. Cancelled due to the COVID-19 pandemic.

2022
 Neptune Strike 22 started in late January with aircraft carrier USS Harry S. Truman and its battle group coming under NATO command for patrolling exercises in the Mediterranean Sea.
 Cold Response 2022. 30,000 participants from 27 countries. Norwegian-led in Norway starting 14 March expected to end in April.
 Iron Spear (8 May—11 May). Hosted in Latvia, 15 teams of tanks and infantry fighting vehicles from seven countries take part in an exercise to demonstrate NATO firepower and interoperability.
 Northern Coasts (29 August—28 September): longer than usual
 Steadfast Noon (17 October—30 October). NATO nuclear deterrence exercise involving 14 countries and up to 60 aircraft of various types, including fourth and fifth generation fighter jets, as well as surveillance and tanker aircraft. As in previous years, US B-52 long-range bombers will take part; this year, they will fly from Minot Air Base in North Dakota. Training flights will take place over Belgium, which is hosting the exercise, as well as over the North Sea and the United Kingdom.

References